The president of the University of the Philippines (Filipino: Pangulo ng Unibersidad ng Pilipinas) is the chief administrator and principal executive officer of the University of the Philippines. The president is elected for a single six-year term by the University's eleven-member Board of Regents (BOR). (Before the passage of RA 9500, there were 12 members in the BOR). As of 2023, two Americans and 20 Filipinos have served as President of the University of the Philippines.

Lawyer and former Regent Angelo Jimenez is the current President, having assumed office on February 10, 2023.

List of presidents of the University of the Philippines

References 

University of the Philippines
Presidents of universities and colleges in the Philippines